Eyvind Earle (April 26, 1916 – July 20, 2000) was an American artist, author and illustrator, noted for his contribution to the background illustration and styling of Disney's animated films in the 1950s. The Metropolitan Museum of Art, New York, Rahr West Art Museum, Phoenix Art Museum and Arizona State University Art Museum have purchased Earle's works for their permanent collections. His works have also been shown in many one-man exhibitions throughout the world.

Early life 
Earle was born in New York, but his family moved to Hollywood in 1918. His mother, Charlotte, was a piano teacher. A childhood bout with polio affected muscles on the left side of his face. He began painting when he was 10 years old, and had his first solo show in France when he was 14.

Career
Earle's first New York exhibition was at the Charles Morgan Galleries in 1937. In a 1939 exhibition, the Metropolitan Museum of Art purchased one of his works for its permanent collection. His work at this time was realistic painting.

Starting in 1939 Earle began his long and successful career of selling Christmas cards, that he designed and printed himself for the American Artist Group. Starting out merely as a means of survival, he formed a Christmas card company called "Monroe and Earle" with an old family friend of his. He printed these cards with the help of Everett Ball, with whom he later formed a separate company by the name of "Earle and Ball". He created over 800 designs between 1938 and 1995, and sold more than 300 million copies.

In 1951 he joined Walt Disney Productions as an assistant background painter and received credit for the experimental background painting in the Goofy short, For Whom the Bulls Toil. In 1953 he created the look of Toot, Whistle, Plunk and Boom, a short animated film which won an Academy Award and a Cannes Film Festival Award. He also worked on Peter Pan, Working for Peanuts, Pigs is Pigs, Paul Bunyan, and Lady and the Tramp. He was responsible for the styling, background and colors for the highly acclaimed Sleeping Beauty.

In 1961, Earle completed an 18-minute animated segment of the Nativity story for the Tennessee Ernie Ford hosted television special The Story Of Christmas on NBC.

Earle returned to full-time painting in 1966, producing watercolors, oils, sculptures, drawings, scratchboards, and limited-edition serigraphs. Much of this work was not exhibited in his lifetime.

He died of esophageal cancer in 2000.

Legacy

Earle was critically acclaimed by such publications as Time, the Los Angeles Times, The New York Times, The New York World-Telegram, The Art News and The New York Sun.

Earle's work and distinct graphic styling has continued to inspire new generations of artists and animators, serving to influence the look of other animated films. These have included the Disney features Pocahontas and Frozen, as well as the graphic style of Sony Pictures Animation's debut film, Open Season.

The Banner Saga, a video game by developers Stoic, draws heavily from Earle's style and contains a character named after him. He is credited for 'Artistic Inspiration'.

In May 2017 The Walt Disney Family Museum hosted an 8-month original retrospective exhibit: Awaking Beauty: The Art of Eyvind Earle. An accompanying hard cover exhibition catalog was published under the same name .

Awards

In 1998, Earle was honored at the 26th Annie Awards with the Winsor McCay Award for a lifetime achievement in the art of animation.

In 2015, in a presentation at the D23 Expo in Anaheim, California, Earle was inducted as a Disney Legend. His daughter, Kristin Thompson, accepted on her father's behalf.

References

External links

Eyvind Earle – Peter and Wendy (Little Golden Books illustrations)

1916 births
2000 deaths
American illustrators
20th-century American painters
American male painters
Walt Disney Animation Studios people
Background artists
Deaths from esophageal cancer
Deaths from cancer in California